Brian George Gardiner PPLS (30 October 1932 - 21 January 2021) was a British palaeontologist and zoologist, specialising in the study of fossil fish (palaeoichthyology).

Early life and education
Gardiner was born on 30 October 1932 in Cashes Green, Gloucestershire.  He was educated at Marling School, Stroud and then took a first degree in zoology at Imperial College London, where he specialised in entomology.  This was followed by a PhD in palaeontology at University College London at which time he was a scientific associate at the Natural History Museum, London.

Academic career
Gardiner was appointed an assistant lecturer in palaeontology at Queen Elizabeth College in 1958, and was later made Professor of Palaeontology at the Department of Biology at the same college. Queen Elizabeth College later merged with King's College London (1985). In 1963 he worked on secondment at the University of Alberta, Edmonton. In 1969 Gardiner described 7 new genera and species of palaeoniscid fish from Witteberg in South Africa. He was president of the Linnean Society of London 1994–1997, and was later made a Fellow Honoris Causa of the same society. He was an advisor on palaeontology to the Natural History Museum in London.

His research interests were in the anatomy, taxonomy and evolution of fish, particularly actinopterygians, including Devonian palaeoniscids. Two genera of Permian palaeoniscoid fish, Gardinerichthys and Gardinerpiscis, were named in his honour.

Gardiner also investigated the celebrated Piltdown Man palaeontological forgery.

Gardiner retired from King's College in 1998.

Marriage and children
Gardiner married Elizabeth Jameson in 1961.  They had three children; Nicholas, Catherine and Clare.

Death
Gardiner died in London on 21 January 2021, aged 88.  He was survived by his wife, three children and seven grandchildren.

Selected publications
 Brian George Gardiner, (1966) Catalogue of Canadian fossil fishes, University of Toronto Press.
 

 Brian George Gardiner (1984) Devonian Palaeoniscid Fishes: New Specimens of Mimia and Moythomasia from the Upper Devonian of Western Australia, University of California Press.

References

Fellows of the Linnean Society of London
Presidents of the Linnean Society of London
1932 births
2021 deaths
British palaeontologists
Alumni of Imperial College London
Alumni of University College London
Academics of King's College London
Academics of Queen Elizabeth College
People educated at Marling School